Dominic Longo (born 23 August 1970) is an Australian retired football (soccer) player. He was an Australian Institute of Sport scholarship holder.

Longo played for the Australian national football team between 1993 and 1998.

References

1970 births
Living people
Australian soccer players
Cercle Brugge K.S.V. players
Marconi Stallions FC players
Australian Institute of Sport soccer players
Australian people of Italian descent
Australia international soccer players
Olympic soccer players of Australia
Footballers at the 1992 Summer Olympics
1998 OFC Nations Cup players
Blacktown City FC players
Association football defenders
Newcastle Breakers FC players